The Cumberland Railway was an interurban trolley system of the early 20th century in central Pennsylvania. Built in 1908, the line ran  from Carlisle to Newville. Poorly capitalized, the line failed in 1918 and was scrapped.

The line was projected to extend to Harrisburg and Shippensburg, where it would have connected to the Chambersburg and Shippensburg Railway, and through that line to the Chambersburg, Greencastle and Waynesboro Street Railway, providing service from Harrisburg to Maryland.

The CR used a  broad gauge, similar to other Pennsylvania interurban lines.

References 

Defunct Pennsylvania railroads
Interurban railways in Pennsylvania
Transportation in Cumberland County, Pennsylvania
Railway companies disestablished in 1918
5 ft 2½ in gauge railways in the United States
1908 establishments in Pennsylvania
1918 disestablishments in Pennsylvania
American companies established in 1908
Railway companies established in 1908